Preeya Kalidas (born 21 June 1980) is an English singer and actress. She played Amira Masood in the soap opera EastEnders, from 2009 to 2012. She released the single "Shimmy" in July 2010, taken from her proposed debut album (I'm Over It) Constant Craving; however, the album was never released.

Early life
Preeya Kalidas was born to Indian Gujarati parents in Isleworth, and was raised in Twickenham, South-West London. Her father is an independent financial adviser, and her mother works for British Airways. She started ballet classes at the age of three, and tap at five. She then trained at the Sylvia Young Theatre School in London. She also trained at Songtime Theatre Arts.

Career

1998–2010
Kalidas first appeared on screen in the drama Googleyes. She went on to play Usha in a short film called Jump Boy in 1998, directed by Menhaj Huda and written by Harsha Patel. After a number of parts in films and on television, including East is East, Bollywood Queen, My Family and Casualty, in 2002 she appeared as Monica in Gurinder Chadha's film Bend It Like Beckham. She then played the female lead Priya in the Andrew Lloyd Webber-produced show Bombay Dreams, written by A.R. Rahman, Meera Syal and Don Black. She also appeared in the BBC Television series Bodies as Dr. Maya Dutta.

In 2007, Kalidas landed the female lead in a West End revival of Lloyd Webber and Tim Rice's Joseph and the Amazing Technicolor Dreamcoat. Appearing as the narrator, she performed with Lee Mead, who won the title role of Joseph in BBC One's Any Dream Will Do talent search series. The same year, she appeared in the multi-award-winning Channel 4 miniseries Britz. In 2009, Kalidas appeared in the second series of BBC One's Mistresses, and joined EastEnders in April of that year as Amira Shah, the girlfriend, and later wife of Syed Masood. In January 2010, she decided to quit EastEnders to pursue a pop career. Her final episode was broadcast on 26 April 2010. In July 2011, Kalidas revealed that she would be returning to EastEnders in the latter part of 2011. Kalidas, then left the show in March 2012. In September 2012, it was announced that Kalidas was returning to EastEnders briefly to conclude with the departures of Marc Elliott and John Partridge who play Syed Masood and Christian Clarke respectively.

Kalidas appeared in Hotel Babylon as Aisha Chaudhri, the daughter of a rich Indian hotel owner. She also appeared in the music video "Love Is Blind" by Ramzi featuring Ash King. In December 2009, she played the part of Leanne in ITV comedy drama Mister Eleven. She starred in the 2010 Chris Morris feature film Four Lions playing Sofia, the wife of protagonist Omar (played by Riz Ahmed). The film was released on 7 May.

After leaving EastEnders, Kalidas began to pursue a career in music, signing a record deal with Universal Records. Her second single, "Shimmy", featuring Mumzy Stranger, was released on 26 July 2010. Kalidas appeared on several programmes including the National Lottery Results and Loose Women in promotion of the single. The single received mixed reviews. Ruth Harrison from FemaleFirst stated that she "liked the single" but was not keen on the genre of music.

Kalidas stated in an interview with Digital Spy that her album would consist of a variety of genres. She also confirmed that the album would include collaborations with Bashy, Skepta, Schorcer, Ramzi and Mumzy Stranger. Kalidas' collaboration with Skepta, "Cross My Heart", was released in October 2010 as the lead single from Skepta's second studio album, Doin' It Again, however, at the time of release, Kalidas firmly stated its inclusion on her debut album.

2011–present
In 2011, it was announced that due to poor sales of "Shimmy", Kalidas would no longer be releasing an album with Universal Records. In the same month Kalidas was awarded the Best Female Act award at the UK Asian Music Awards, where she performed a new song, "I Like You", alongside "Shimmy" and her collaboration with Skepta, "Cross My Heart". In July 2011, Kalidas signed a new record deal with All Around The World. In September 2011, Kalidas' second single, "It's A Problem", premiered on YouTube. The single features vocals from rapper Scorcher, who had previously been rumoured to appear on the album. The music video for "It's A Problem" premiered on 3 October 2011. The digital package of the single was released on 10 October, containing "I Like You", as well as a further new song, "Dirty Kissin'". Kalidas announced the album's third single, "A Woman Scorn" during an interview on Lorraine in November 2011. However it was never released. In June 2012, Kalidas eventually released her third single titled; "Love Between Us" which featured British producer, DaVinChe, on backing vocals.

In March 2014, Kalidas released the single "Don't Give Up" was working towards release of her debut studio album in 2015. In April 2014 she released a new single called "Can't Live Without You". Both singles will appear on the album. She has also covered a variety of tracks including Beyoncé's track "Blue".

In June 2015, Kalidas began playing the role of Pinky, in the new West End musical Bend It Like Beckham. She previously played the role of Monica in the film version. In 2019, it was announced that she would play the role of Miss Hedge in the hit musical Everybody's Talking About Jamie from 19 November.

In 2018, Kalidas co-hosted the Brit Asia TV Music Awards with Apache Indian.

Discography

Singles

Featured singles

Filmography

Television

Film

Awards and nominations

Television

Music

Theatre

References

External links
 

1980 births
Living people
People from Isleworth
English women singers
English musical theatre actresses
English people of Gujarati descent
Mercury Records artists
British actresses of Indian descent
English soap opera actresses
BBC Asian Network presenters